The Minnesota State Mavericks women's ice hockey program represented Minnesota State University, Mankato during the 2015-16 NCAA Division I women's ice hockey season.

Recruiting

2015–16 Mavericks

Schedule

|-
!colspan=12 style="background:purple;color:gold;"| Regular Season

|-
!colspan=12 style="background:purple;color:gold;"| WCHA Tournament

References

Minnesota State
Minnesota State Mavericks women's ice hockey seasons
Minnesota State